Riojasaurus (meaning "Rioja lizard") was a herbivorous sauropodomorph dinosaur named after La Rioja Province in Argentina where it was found in the Los Colorados Formation in the Ischigualasto-Villa Unión Basin by José Bonaparte. Riojasaurus is the only known riojasaurid to live in South America.

Description 

Riojasaurus had a heavy body, bulky legs, and a long neck and tail. Its leg bones were dense and massive for an early sauropodomorph. By contrast, its vertebrae were lightened by hollow cavities, and unlike most early sauropodomorphs, Riojasaurus had four sacral vertebrae instead of three. It has been thought it probably moved slowly on all fours and was unable to rear up on its back legs. The nearly equal length of the fore and hindlimbs has also been interpreted as suggestive of an obligatorily quadrupedal gait, and the relative robustness of the forelimbs and hindlimbs is in the range of quadrupedal animals. However, the morphology of the hand and shoulder girdle has been interpreted as inconsistent with a quadrupedal gait.

No skull was found with the first skeleton of Riojasaurus, although a well-preserved skull attributed to Riojasaurus was found later. The teeth of Riojasaurus were leaf shaped and serrated. The upper jaw contained 5 teeth at the front, with 24 more behind them in a row that ended under the eyes.

Comparisons between the scleral rings of Riojasaurus and modern birds and reptiles suggest that it may have been cathemeral, active throughout the day at short intervals.

Classification 
 
Many scientists think that Riojasaurus was closely related to Melanorosaurus, known from the Triassic-Early Jurassic period. However, studies at Bristol University, England, suggest that it is unique in some key ways, such as the longer bones in its neck. It is certainly quite different from other sauropodomorphs found in the Los Colorados Formation of Argentina.

Due to their size and limb anatomy Riojasaurus and the possibly related Melanorosaurus have been considered close relatives of the earliest sauropods.

References

External links 

Sauropodomorphs
Dinosaur genera
Norian life
Late Triassic dinosaurs of South America
Triassic Argentina
Fossils of Argentina
Los Colorados Formation
Fossil taxa described in 1969
Taxa named by José Bonaparte